Charlie Maddock (born 15 November 1995) is an English taekwondo athlete.

In May 2015, Maddock competed for Great Britain in the -49kg category at the 2015 World Taekwondo Championships. She reached the quarter-finals before being beaten 15-0 by Wu Jingyu.

In June 2015, Maddock took part in the inaugural European Games, winning Great Britain's first taekwondo medal at those games winning a gold medal.

In 2016, Maddock won her first global title, taking the World Grand Prix in London in the one-off final event.

References

Living people
English female taekwondo practitioners
People from Stoke-on-Trent
1995 births
Taekwondo practitioners at the 2015 European Games
European Games medalists in taekwondo
European Games gold medalists for Great Britain
Sportspeople from Staffordshire